Irakli Kortua (born 5 October 1987) is a Georgian football player, currently playing under for SK Blāzma.

External links
Kortua's profile at Dynamomania.com

1987 births
Association football defenders
Footballers from Georgia (country)
Expatriate footballers from Georgia (country)
Living people
FC Dynamo Kyiv players
Expatriate footballers in Ukraine